José Zapata may refer to:

 José Antonio Zapata (painter) (1762–1837), Spanish painter
 José Zapata (baseball), former Minor League Baseball player and manager of the Dominican Summer League Red Sox

Others 
 René Higuita, Colombian professional football player (born José René Higuita Zapata)

See also 
 Zapata (surname)